The Infamous (stylized as The Infamous...) is the second studio album by the American hip hop duo Mobb Deep. It was released on April 25, 1995, by RCA Records and Loud Records. The album features guest appearances by Nas, Raekwon, Ghostface Killah, and Q-Tip. It was largely produced by group member Havoc, with Q-Tip also contributing production while serving as the mixing engineer. Most of the leftover songs from the album became bonus tracks for Mobb Deep's The Infamous Mobb Deep album (2014).

Upon its release, The Infamous achieved notable commercial success, debuting at number 15 on the US Billboard 200 and number 3 on the Top R&B/Hip Hop Albums charts. On February 21, 2020, the album was certified Platinum by the Recording Industry Association of America (RIAA). The album produced four singles; "Shook Ones (Part II)", "Survival of the Fittest", "Temperature's Rising", "Give Up the Goods (Just Step)"; the first three singles achieved varying degrees of chart success, with "Shook Ones (Part II)" being the most successful.

The album's dark style, defined by its evocative melodies, rugged beats, and introspective lyrics concerning crime in New York's inner city neighborhoods, received special recognition and critical praise. Along with albums such as Enter the Wu-Tang (36 Chambers), Illmatic and Ready to Die, The Infamous is widely credited as a major contributor to the East Coast Renaissance. Furthermore, the album is credited with helping to redefine the sound of hardcore hip hop, using its production style, which incorporated eerie piano loops, distorted synthesizers, eighth-note hi-hats, and sparse filtered basslines. In 2020, the album was ranked 369th on Rolling Stone's updated list of the 500 Greatest Albums of All Time.

Background

During the spring of 1993, while the group was still in their late teens, Mobb Deep released their first album Juvenile Hell under the 4th & B'way Records label. The album included production from several revered New York-based producers, including Large Professor, DJ Premier, and Public Enemy affiliate Kerwin Young, and included the underground hit single "Hit It from the Back". Due to Juvenile Hell failure to achieve significant commercial and critical success, the duo was dropped from their label several months after the album's release. Havoc and Prodigy later described Juvenile Hell as a "learning experience".

During the summer of 1993, Loud Records was looking for another group to sign, owing to the success of Wu-Tang Clan's first single, "Protect Ya Neck", and by fall 1993, the label had signed Mobb Deep. In 1994, the group released the promotional single "Shook Ones", which served as a preview of their new sound. Unlike the duo's first album, The Infamous was mostly self-produced by Havoc and Prodigy, with outside help from Loud A&R representatives Matt Life (aka Matty C) and Schott Free, as well as A Tribe Called Quest producer Q-Tip, who discovered Mobb Deep in the early 1990s. Matt Life later recalled Q-Tip's involvements, stating, "Tip was very involved in The Infamous from early on. Probably more than people know. Tip was just a fan of theirs and I knew him from way back, so he was really helpful, giving them advice." Q-Tip's contributions to the album were credited under his alias "The Abstract".

On the group's decision to handle most of the production, Havoc later commented, "We started producing because other producers was giving us shit that we didn't like, or they was just charging too much. I didn't know nothing about producing music at the time, but I learned by watching others."

Recording and production
Recording sessions for The Infamous began in 1994 and took place at Battery Studios, Platinum Island Studios, Firehouse Studios and Unique Recording in New York City. Havoc produced most of the beats in his Queensbridge apartment, with Prodigy often assisting him; earlier in their career, Prodigy taught him how to sample. Describing their minimal production setup, Prodigy said, "Our first sampler we had was an EPS 16 plus  ... We had that for a little while, and when the MPC came out we bought that, and that was it. A little record player, a little mixer, and that's all we needed."

Mobb Deep initially recorded 20 songs for The Infamous, but executive producers Matt Life and Schott Free worked with them to improve the music. Matt Life recalled, "Schott worked closely with them on how the rhymes were coming and I worked closely with them on how production was coming. The first thing that I remember is them creating a semblance of the core of the first album and me creating a rough in-house version of what the album could be and throwing a sticker on the cassette." The early rough version of the album contained five or six songs, including the original versions of the album's four singles. The original "Temperature's Rising" was remade because of sample clearance issues.

Later on, Q-Tip became the album's mixing engineer; Matt Life explained, "he came in later in the sessions and said he'd help mix a couple records. And then he ended up picking a couple of records they did to re-do. Except for 'Drink Away the Pain', the songs that Tip produced were already a full song before he got to them. He liked the lyrics on those original songs, but he re-did the beats. It was the same song title, same hook, same rhymes, just new beats." Q-Tip also improved the drum programming on "Survival of the Fittest", "Up North Trip" and "Trife Life". Describing his contributions as "a totally different sound than the Tribe stuff", Q-Tip encouraged Mobb Deep to make their dark sound stand out, by telling them to add major chords to their minor key samples. Havoc later stated, "Q-Tip definitely bent his style a little bit to get with what we was doing. Like with 'Drink Away the Pain' you see him trying to get gangsta with it." Schott Free summed up Q-Tip's influence:

Lyrically, Mobb Deep added to the album's dark aesthetic. Speaking about his verse on "Survival of the Fittest", Havoc explained, "We were just straight hood. It wasn't no pretty boy shit. It was like, 'Yo, let's throw on our Timbs.' It didn't get more harder than that." On each track, they rapped about the realities of prison, murder, robbery, selling drugs and alcoholism, among other topics. Big Noyd had a significant presence on the album, with four guest appearances; discussing the "Just Step Prelude", Prodigy recalled, "That shit right there, that was a rhyme that Noyd used to kick in the projects everyday to niggas  ... He'd spit that shit that had the whole block going crazy." Big Noyd initially preferred to sell drugs and had no desire to be a rapper, until the group convinced him otherwise. The remaining guest appearances happened in various ways; Nas was a childhood friend of Havoc, Raekwon and Ghostface Killah of Wu-Tang Clan were Mobb Deep's labelmates and Crystal Johnson was an associate of Q-Tip.

Cover artwork
The cover art for The Infamous was created in Queensbridge Houses, New York by photographer Delphine A. Fawundu, who later commented about the photography session in Vikki Tobak's 2018 analog hip hop photography collective Contact High: A Visual History of Hip-Hop (published by Clarkson Potter), "I was inspired by how all these elements came together, making New York hip-hop such a force at that time. It just felt so powerful and it was all happening right before my eyes, and my camera". In 2019, images from Fawundu's photoshoot with Mobb Deep and the previously unseen contact prints were featured in a full-size museum exhibit at The Annenberg Space for Photography in Los Angeles.

Reception

Commercial performance
The album spent 18 weeks on the US Billboard 200, peaking at number 15, and it also spent 34 weeks on the Top R&B/Hip-Hop Albums charts, peaking at number 3. The Infamous was certified gold, with shipments of 500,000 copies in the United States by the Recording Industry Association of America (RIAA) on June 26, 1995. The singles "Shook Ones (Part II)" and "Survival of the Fittest" reached number 59 and 69 on the Billboard Hot 100, respectively, and also reached the Top 10 on the Hot Rap Singles chart.

Initial reaction 

Upon its release, The Infamous received widespread critical acclaim. Los Angeles Times critic Heidi Siegmund wrote that Mobb Deep "may be the toughest young force in hip-hop", noting their "slow, stealthy beats" and "dark poetic talents". NME remarked that the duo "bring the clipped, rolling style of Rakim or EPMD, adding a chill menace to neighborhood boasts like 'Right Back at You' and 'Eye for a Eye'." Entertainment Weekly Tiarra Mukherjee likewise noted their "mostly self-produced, bare-bones beats" and lyrics, which "paint a chilling picture of life on their mean streets, New York City's Queensbridge Housing Projects", concluding, "Underground rap-heads — and those who can break away from Jeep beats — will rejoice." Spin journalist Chris Norris highlighted the bleak lyrical content of the album, which he described as "state-of-the-art East Coast reportage: drug-selling, police-fleeing, and homie-dying vignettes, all told with vivid detail and a deadpan thousand-yard flow". Norris also found that the album's production transcended the conventions associated with East Coast hip hop beats, instead "mixing warm, old Quest-style Blue Note whispers, gritty snares, and stark keyboard chimes like Satie or Bill Evans with an MPC-60."

Elliott Wilson from Vibe was highly positive in his appraisal of the album: "Each song is a different chapter in the hard street life Havoc and Prodigy have experienced in their Queensbridge neighborhood ... While describing their lives with brutal realism and raw imagery, Havoc's love for his hometown hits you in the head like a Mike Tyson comeback punch." The Source Dimitry Leger stated, "Mobb Deep earn credibility, winning the crucial battle between style and substance, who's real and who's a move-faker. Havoc and Prodigy simply report what they know." Writing for Rolling Stone, Cheo H. Coker called it "a darkly nihilistic masterpiece".

Legacy 
Since its initial release, The Infamous has earned additional critical praise and has been widely regarded as a cornerstone album of New York hardcore rap. AllMusic's Steve Huey wrote that it stands as "Mobb Deep's masterpiece, a relentlessly bleak song cycle that's been hailed by hardcore rap fans as one of the most realistic gangsta albums ever recorded [...] it has all the foreboding atmosphere and thematic sweep of an epic crime drama. That's partly because of the cinematic vision behind the duo's detailed narratives, but it's also a tribute to how well the raw, grimy production evokes the world that Mobb Deep is depicting." According to Consequence of Sounds Okla Jones, it "solidified Mobb Deep in hip-hop lore" and became "the blueprint for the traditional New York hardcore sound".

In 2002, The Source reappraised The Infamous and gave it a perfect five-mic rating, stating: "Prodigy's thugged-out entertainment and Havoc's sonic production on cuts like the bone-chilling 'Shook Ones Pt. ll'  ... proved to be timeless street joints in the same vein as 'Life's a Bitch' and 'You Gots to Chill.' The album was a staple for all hardheaded delinquents comin' up in the game." In 2004's The New Rolling Stone Album Guide, critic Chris Ryan called it "one of the greatest rap albums of the [1990s]". XXL magazine gave it a classic rating of "XXL" in its retrospective December 2007 issue. In 2013, hip-hop journalist Jeff "Chairman" Mao hailed The Infamous as "an iconic New York record", while noting Q-Tip's understated role in its creation. Reviewing the album's 2014 reissue, Pitchfork critic Jayson Greene remarked on its lasting impact:

Track listing 

"Up North Trip" is omitted from cassette versions.

Sample credits
"The Start of Your Ending" contains a sample from "Maybe Tomorrow" performed by Grant Green.
"Survival of the Fittest" contains a sample from "Skylark" performed by The Barry Harris Trio and Al Cohn.
"Eye for a Eye" contains a sample from "I Wish You Were Here" performed by Al Green.
"Give Up the Goods" contains a sample from "That's All Right With Me" performed by Esther Phillips.
"Temperature's Rising" contains samples from "UFO" performed by ESG, "Where There Is Love" performed by Patrice Rushen, and an interpolation of "Body Heat" performed by Quincy Jones.
"Up North Trip" contains samples from "To Be With You" performed by The Fatback Band, and "I'm Tired Of Giving" performed by The Spinners.
"Trife Life" contains a sample from "You Are My Starship" performed by Norman Connors.
"Q.U.-Hectic" contains samples from "Kitty With the Bent Frame" performed by Quincy Jones, and "Black Frost" performed by Grover Washington Jr.
"Right Back at You" contains a sample from "Benjamin" performed by Les McCann.
"Cradle to the Grave" contains a sample from "And If I Had" performed by Teddy Pendergrass.
"Drink Away the Pain" contains a sample from "I Remember I Made You Cry" performed by The Headhunters and "Fly, Fly, the Route, Shoot" performed by If.
"Shook Ones Pt. II" contains samples from "Dirty Feet" performed by Daly Wilson Big Band, "Jessica" performed by Herbie Hancock, and "Kitty With The Bent Frame" performed by Quincy Jones.   
"Party Over" contains samples from "Lonely Fire" performed by Miles Davis, and "Outside Love" performed by Brethren.

Personnel

Havoc – performer, producer
Prodigy – performer, producer
The Abstract – performer, producer, mixing
Big Noyd – performer
Raekwon – performer
Nas – performer
Ghostface Killah – performer
Crystal Johnson – vocals
Matt Life – producer
Schott Free – producer

Fal Prod – producer
Louis Alfred III – engineer
Tim Latham – engineer
Tony Smalios – engineer, mixing
Dino Zerros – engineer
Leon Zervos – mastering
Merge One – art direction
Chi Modu – photography
Tami Cobbs – management
Sandra Bynum – management

Charts

Weekly charts

Year-end charts

Certifications

Accolades
Information regarding accolades is extracted from acclaimedmusic.net, except for lists with additional sources.
 An asterisk (*) indicates unordered lists.

Notes

References

External links
The Infamous at Discogs
Album Review at RapReviews.com
Album Accolades and Ratings at acclaimedmusic.net

Mobb Deep albums
1995 albums
Albums produced by Havoc (musician)
Albums produced by Q-Tip (musician)
Loud Records albums
RCA Records albums